Bertrand Demond Berry (born August 15, 1975) is a former American football defensive end in the National Football League (NFL).

Early years
Berry, whose nickname is "King" started his football career in the Humble Area Football League with the Cardinals as a running back.HAFL
Berry attended Humble High School in Humble, Texas, and was a star running back for the Wildcats. where he was a three-sport standout in basketball, football, and track. In basketball, he was a two-time all-district selection, and in track, he threw the discus and set the school record for the shuttle hurdle relays.

College career
Berry attended the University of Notre Dame and was a four-year letterman in football. He finished his NCAA football career with 187 tackles and 16.5 sacks.

Professional career
Berry was selected by the Indianapolis Colts in the third round of the 1997 NFL Draft, starting out as a linebacker before switching to defensive end. He spent most of his time there playing between defense and special teams, starting most of the games on defense. He signed with the St. Louis Rams in 2000, but was cut during training camp.

He signed with the Edmonton Eskimos of the Canadian Football League on September 26, 2000 on October 11 after seeing action in two games. He recorded one tackle in his two appearances.

By the 2003 season with the Denver Broncos, he was the starter at defensive end and led the team in tackles and sacks. He was picked up as a free agent by Arizona before the 2004 season, during which he was named as a starter to represent the NFC in the 2005 Pro Bowl.

On March 18, 2009, Berry agreed to a one-year contract.

On January 21, 2010, Berry announced his retirement from the NFL. He finished his career with 232 total tackles, 65 sacks and 13 forced fumbles.

NFL statistics

Key
 GP: games played
 COMB: combined tackles
 TOTAL: total tackles
 AST: assisted tackles
 SACK: sacks
 FF: forced fumbles
 FR: fumble recoveries

Broadcasting career
In August 2011, Berry began hosting a radio show on The Fan AM 1060 KDUS in Phoenix called "The Bertrand Berry Show" with Mike Grose every weekday from 1:00 to 3:00. The show was cancelled effective December 28, 2012.

On April 23, 2015, Berry had a fill-in role for Ron Wolfley on the Doug and Wolf Show on Arizona Sports 98.7 FM, a local Arizona radio station. On August 3, Berry began hosting "Off the Edge with B-Train" on Arizona Sports 98.7 FM.

References

External links
Arizona Cardinals bio
Foundation Website

1975 births
Living people
Players of American football from Houston
Players of Canadian football from Houston
African-American players of American football
American football defensive ends
American football outside linebackers
Notre Dame Fighting Irish football players
Indianapolis Colts players
Denver Broncos players
Arizona Cardinals players
National Conference Pro Bowl players
African-American players of Canadian football
Canadian football defensive linemen
Edmonton Elks players
21st-century African-American sportspeople
20th-century African-American sportspeople
Ed Block Courage Award recipients